Blairstown is an unincorporated community and census-designated place (CDP) located within Blairstown Township, in Warren County, New Jersey, United States, that was created as part of the 2010 United States Census. As of the 2010 United States Census, the CDP's population was 515.

Geography
According to the United States Census Bureau, the CDP had a total area of 0.432 square miles (1.120 km2), including 0.425 square miles (1.102 km2) of land and 0.007 square miles (0.019 km2) of water (1.65%).

Demographics

Census 2010

References

Blairstown, New Jersey
Census-designated places in Warren County, New Jersey